Sweetwater is an upcoming American sports biographical independent film directed and written by Martin Guigui. It  stars Everett Osborne, Cary Elwes, Jeremy Piven, Richard Dreyfuss and Kevin Pollak. Osborne portrays Nat Clifton as the film depicts the true story of his career in the 1950s, starting with the Harlem Globetrotters before becoming the first African-American to sign a contract with the National Basketball Association (NBA).

Premise
Nat "Sweetwater" Clifton is the main attraction of the Harlem Globetrotters team, under the guidance of their owner and coach, Abe Saperstein. As Ned Irish, a New York Knicks executive, and their coach, Joe Lapchick, take the initiative to integrate the team with support of NBA President, Maurice Podoloff. They soon join hands with the other owners of the league and create a historic moment.

Cast
 Everett Osborne as Nat "Sweetwater" Clifton
 Cary Elwes as Ned Irish
 Jeremy Piven as Joe Lapchick
 Richard Dreyfuss as Maurice Podoloff
 Kevin Pollak as Abe Saperstein
 Robert Ri'chard  
 Gary Clark Jr.
 Jim Caviezel
 Bobby Portis
 Eric Roberts as Judd
 Mike Starr

Production
In December 2006, it was reported that Martin Guigui had been working on a biopic project about the career of Nat Clifton for the last ten years. The project by Sunset Pictures was reported by Variety to begin production in April 2007 with Guigui directing from a screenplay he wrote. Henry Simmons was attached to play Nat Clifton and Richard Dreyfuss to portray Abe Saperstein, the owner and founder of the Harlem Globetrotters. Romeo Miller had also signed on to play a younger Clifton. Principal photography was set take place in the San Francisco Bay area and New York City that summer. The Great Recession caused a delay production and by April 2009 filming was expected to start in Winnipeg. Two Lagoons and Astra Blue Media were then attached to co-produce, along with additional cast members of Mira Sorvino, Kevin Pollak, James Caan and Smokey Robinson.

By July 2014, some cast members had been replaced. Wood Harris replaced Simmons as Nat Clifton, Nathan Lane would play Saperstein and James Caan as Ned Irish.  Brian Dennehy, Patrick Warburton and Ludacris were all attached to star in undisclosed roles. The production budget was reported to be $10 million and filming was expected to begin in New York in late 2014.  

Production was subsequently completed by October 2022, with Pollak as Saperstein, Dreyfuss as Maurice Podoloff, Cary Elwes as Irish, Jeremy Piven as Joe Lapchick. Gary Clark Jr,  Jim Caviezel and Bobby Portis make cameos.

Release
Sweetwater is scheduled to be released on April 14, 2023, by Briarcliff Entertainment.

References

External link
 
 
 
 

2023 independent films
2020s biographical films
2020s English-language films
Biographical films about sportspeople
American films based on actual events
2020s biographical drama films
American sports drama films
Sports films based on actual events